The action of 15 September 1782 was a naval action in the mouth of the Delaware Bay in which four Royal Naval vessels under the command of George Elphinstone pursued and attacked three French warships that included two frigates under the command of Comte de la Touche Tréville. The French 38-gun frigate Aigle was grounded and captured along with the Comte de la Touche.

Background
In early 1782, Captain Latouche-Tréville assumed command of Aigle, which, along with the frigate Gloire, ferried funds and equipment for the fleet of Admiral Vaudreil. On 5 September 1782 Aigle and Gloire encountered the recently acquired British ship Hector, a former French ship of the line that had been severely damaged and then captured during the Battle of the Saintes. Hector managed to escape, but she was damaged further and later sank in the 1782 Central Atlantic hurricane.  

Aigle and Gloire chased the British sloop  of 16 guns, Lieutenant Richard Goodwin Keats through the night of 11 September 1782, but she evaded her pursuers. The next morning the French were seen by the brig 14), Lieutenant Nagle who had departed company from the squadron off the Delaware River and who unfortunately failed to identify them as enemy ships until too late. After receiving raking fire he was forced to surrender. Keats re-joined the squadron and reported his encounter the previous night.   

Latouche hoisted signals requesting a pilot, but none was forthcoming. At 2100, the division dropped anchor and Gloire sent a boat to Lewistown to request a pilot, but the boat did not return.

The British set out in chase; Captain Elphinstone, in the 50-gun ship Warwick, dispatched the lighter vessels 28-gun frigate Vestal, the sloop Bonetta and the Sophie under command of Richard Keats as they were to traverse shallow waters.

Action
Chased by the British division, Latouche attempted to escape into shallow waters without a pilot, but then discovered that Racoon had a pilot, offering him 500 Louis d'or to lead the frigates. However, when she entered the safe channel, Aigle found her interdicted by the British, and diverted into a secondary channel, which she found to be barred by a sandbank. The British dropped anchor, waiting for the high tide. Meanwhile, Gloires boat finally returned with a pilot, who informed Latouche that his situation was hopeless. Latouche then started evacuating his guests and funds from the frigate all through the afternoon and night. Two British boats attempted to cut away Gloires cutter, and Aigles longboat had to intervene with musket fire.

Around 1000 on the 14th, the British sent a cartel to offer an exchange of prisoners. Latouche agreed and released Racoons captain, Lieutenant Nagle. Soon after, British boats started advancing, and Latouche attempted to retreat deeper into the channel to hopefully lighten his frigates enough so she could sail over the sandbank. Both Gloire and Aigle ran aground, but Gloire managed to cross, while Aigle settled. Racoon crossed the sandbank with no difficulty. 

Gloire succeeded in getting so far up the river that she could not be attacked with any prospect of success, while the British ships had to traverse the shallows without a pilot on board.  Keats took upon himself responsibility for navigating the shallows of the Delaware and continued the chase for two whole days as they eased over banks. Aigle, which now had most of Racoons crew grounded, allowing the Vestal and Bonetta, drawing less water to gain positions to attack the French frigate. The Vestal ran aground on the starboard quarter of the Aigle, the Bonetta anchoring within 200 yards of her larboard quarter, while the Sophie anchored under her stern. 

Latouche had some of Aigles guns thrown overboard and had cut away her masts in an attempt to refloat her, but to no avail. With the descending tide, Aigle settled on the side, rendering her remaining artillery useless. Latouche then started evacuating the frigate and had holes bored in her hull, after which he remained with her and struck her colours on 15 September.  Despite the attempts to scuttle Aigle, the British were able to refloat her and took her into service under her own name. Gloire and Racoon escaped.

Aftermath
Along with the Aigle, the British captured all of Racoons crew. Aigle had had on board some senior French officers, who escaped ashore, as did the now-wealthy pilot. The French officers who escaped included Comte de Rochambeau (commander of the French army), Vicomte de Laval, Duke Laurun, Viscount de Fleury, and some others. In addition, they took most of the treasure the ships were carrying.

The British were able to refloat Aigle and took her into service as HMS Aigle . Comte de La Touche, along with several noblemen that included two of Marquis de Lafayette's family, as well 600 sailors and troops, were captured by the crew of the Royal Naval vessels, helped by a number of British troops who had arrived very late in the action. Comte de La Touche-Tréville remained a prisoner for the rest of the war's duration. Captain Elphinstone allowed Latouche and his mistress to reunite. The Sophie was taken into the navy, but sold two years later.

Notes, citations, and references
Notes

Citations

References
 
 Demerliac, Alain (1996) La Marine De Louis XVI: Nomenclature Des Navires Français De 1774 À 1792. (Nice: Éditions OMEGA). 
 Hannah, P., A Treasure to the Service - Admiral sir Richard Keats, Green hill, Adelaide 2021, ISBN 978-1-922629-73-9
 
 

Naval battles of the American Revolutionary War involving France
Naval battles of the American Revolutionary War
Conflicts in 1782
1782 in the United States
Naval battles of the Anglo-French War (1778–1783)
Battles of the American Revolutionary War in the New York City area after 1777